Charles Laban Abernethy (March 18, 1872 – February 23, 1955) was a Democratic U.S. Congressman from North Carolina between 1922 and 1935.

Born in Rutherford College, North Carolina, Abernethy attended local public schools in Rutherford College before moving to Beaufort, North Carolina in 1893. There, he founded the Beaufort Herald newspaper. Abernethy studied law at the University of North Carolina at Chapel Hill and was admitted to the bar in 1895. Practicing law in Beaufort, he was solicitor of the third (later the fifth) judicial circuit for twelve years, and a member of the executive committee of the North Carolina Democratic Party between 1898 and 1900. 

Abernethy moved to New Bern, North Carolina in 1913, and continued to practice law there. In 1922, he was chosen, in a special election, to fill the seat vacated by the death of Rep. Samuel M. Brinson; he was re-elected to five more terms, serving between November 7, 1922 and January 3, 1935, before being defeated for re-election in 1934. After leaving Congress, he resumed his law practice, retiring in 1938. 

Abernethy died in 1955 in New Bern and is buried in Cedar Grove Cemetery.

He was a cousin to North Carolina's first Poet Laureate Arthur Talmage Abernethy.

References

External links
 

1872 births
1955 deaths
People from Burke County, North Carolina
Democratic Party members of the United States House of Representatives from North Carolina
North Carolina lawyers
Politicians from New Bern, North Carolina
People from Beaufort, North Carolina
University of North Carolina School of Law alumni